"I'm Comin' on Back to You" is a popular song. Recorded and released by Jackie Wilson in 1961, the single peaked at #19 on the Billboard Hot 100.

1961 songs